Jonathan Seth Kellerman (born August 9, 1949) is an American novelist, psychologist, and Edgar- and Anthony Award–winning author best known for his popular mystery novels featuring the character Alex Delaware, a child psychologist who consults for the Los Angeles Police Department.

Born on the Lower East Side of New York City, his family relocated to Los Angeles when Jonathan was nine years old.

Kellerman graduated from the University of Southern California (USC)  with a doctor of philosophy degree in psychology in 1974, and began working as a staff psychologist at the USC School of Medicine, where he eventually became a full clinical professor of pediatrics. He opened a private practice in the early 1980s while writing novels in his garage at night.
 
His first published novel, When the Bough Breaks, appeared in 1985, many years after writing and having works rejected. He then wrote five best-selling novels while still a practicing psychologist. In 1990, he quit his private practice to write full-time. He has written more than 40 crime novels, as well as nonfiction works and children’s books.

Life and career
Kellerman was born in New York City, son of David, an aerospace engineer and inventor, and Sylvia, a dancer and office manager. He attended Yeshiva of Central Queens (YCQ) before his family relocated to California. He grew up in Los Angeles and received a Bachelor of Arts in psychology at UCLA in 1971. He worked his way through college as a cartoonist, illustrator, journalist, and editor, as well as by teaching guitar. As a college senior, he co-wrote an unpublished novel that garnered a Samuel Goldwyn writing award. That prize has served as a stepping stone to film writing for other writers, but Kellerman deliberately avoided the world of screenwriting and enrolled in a PhD program in clinical psychology at USC. He received his doctoral degree in psychology from USC in 1974. His doctoral research was on attribution of blame for childhood psychopathology, and he published a scientific paper on that topic, his first, at the age of 22. He is currently a clinical professor of pediatrics at the Keck School of Medicine.

Kellerman's externship, internship, and postdoctoral fellowship were at the Childrens Hospital of Los Angeles/USC School of Medicine, where he became founding director of the psychosocial program, Division of Hematology-Oncology. Kellerman's initial position at CHLA was conducting research into the effects of psychological isolation in germ-free "plastic bubble" rooms on the emotional and intellectual development of children with cancer.

Simultaneously, he was assigned to minimize the destructive consequences of such intense treatment by developing a multidisciplinary clinical approach. The success of that endeavor  led to the expansion of psychosocial services to all oncology patients at CHLA, and the program developed by Kellerman and his staff was the world’s first attempt to provide comprehensive, systematic, emotional support to pediatric cancer patients and their families, and served as the template for what is now considered appropriate care. Kellerman’s experiences at CHLA led him to publish his first book in 1980, a medical text that he edited, titled Psychological Aspects of Childhood Cancer. He is himself a survivor of thyroid cancer.

During Kellerman’s time at CHLA, he also conducted research and published in the areas of disease impact and adolescence, disease-related communication and its effect upon emotional adjustment,  pediatric pain management, sleep and anxiety disorders, the treatment of childhood encopresis, and the neuropsychological effects of central nervous system chemotherapy and radiation.

Kellerman's extensive work with anxiety disorders led him to publish a book for parents, Helping the Fearful Child, in 1981. Four years later, his first novel, When the Bough Breaks, was published, became a bestseller, and was adapted as a TV movie. He has published one, or occasionally two, bestselling thrillers every year since.  During his tenure as a practicing psychologist, he came into contact with the legal system as a consultant and expert witness, and some of those experiences have impacted his novels.

Jonathan Kellerman lives in Los Angeles with his wife Faye Kellerman, herself a well-known best-selling crime writer. They have four children. Their oldest, Jesse Kellerman, is a best-selling novelist and award-winning playwright. Their youngest, Aliza Kellerman, co-wrote Prism, a young adult novel published in 2009, with her mother.

Jonathan Kellerman has publicly spoken out against what he calls the "misguided" release of severely mentally ill people into the community, where they must fend for themselves instead of receiving proper care. He has stated that such people should receive counseling and psychotherapy as well as medication, as opposed to today's model in which they receive only medication and no other care at all.

Faye and Jonathan Kellerman's decades of philanthropy include endowments at Children's Hospital of Los Angeles Division of Hematology-Oncology, where a yearly lecture has been named after Jonathan, and USC's department of psychology and Thornton School of Music.  They have also contributed  to numerous educational institutions, the Metropolitan Museum of Art's musical instrument department, the Georgia Okeeffe Museum, and the Santa Fe Chamber Music Festival.

Bibliography

Alex Delaware

 When the Bough Breaks (1985) (1986 Edgar Award and Anthony awards, Best First Novel)  This novel was originally titled Shrunken Heads. The novel was adapted as a TV movie in 1986 starring Ted Danson and Richard Masur.
 Blood Test (1986)
 Over the Edge (1987)
 Silent Partner (1989)
 Time Bomb (1990)
 Private Eyes (1992)
 Devil's Waltz (1993)
 Bad Love (1994)
 Self-Defense (1995)
 The Web (1996)
 The Clinic (1997)
 Survival of the Fittest (1997): Featuring Daniel Shalom Sharavi of The Butcher's Theater (1988)
 Monster (1999)
 Dr. Death (2000)
 Flesh and Blood (2001)
 The Murder Book (2002)
 A Cold Heart (2003)
 Therapy (2004)
 Rage (2005)
 Gone (2006)
 Obsession (2007)
 Compulsion (March 2008)
 Bones (October 2008)
 Evidence (October 2009)
 Deception (March 2010)
 Mystery (March 2011)
 Victims (February 2012)
 Guilt (2013)
 Killer (2014)
 Motive (2015)
 Breakdown (2016)
 Heartbreak Hotel (2017)
 Night Moves (February 13, 2018)
 The Wedding Guest (February 5, 2019)
 The Museum of Desire (February 4, 2020)
 Serpentine (February 2, 2021)
 City of the Dead (February 8, 2022)
 Unnatural History (forthcoming, expected February 2023)

Petra Connor
 Billy Straight (1998)
 "A Cold Heart" (2003) with Alex Delaware
 Twisted (2004)

Jacob Lev (with Jesse Kellerman)
 The Golem of Hollywood (2014)
 The Golem of Paris (2015)

Clay Edison (with Jesse Kellerman)
 Crime Scene (2017)
 A Measure of Darkness (July 31, 2018)
 Half Moon Bay (aka Lost Souls) (July 2020)
 The Burning (September 21, 2021)

Nonseries novels
The Butcher's Theater (1988) 
The Conspiracy Club (2003)
Double Homicide (2005) (with Faye Kellerman)
Capital Crimes (2007) (with Faye Kellerman)
True Detectives (2009) Characters also appear in Bones  (October 2008)
The Right Thing to Do (2015)  (eBook Short Story)
The Murderer's Daughter (2015)

Omnibus
Blood Test, When the Bough Breaks, Over the Edge (1990)
Devil's Waltz; Bad Love (2003)
Double Homicide (2005) (with Faye Kellerman)}

Nonfiction
Psychological Aspects of Childhood Cancer (1980)
Helping the Fearful Child (1981)
Savage Spawn: Reflections on Violent Children (1999)
The Best American Crime Reporting 2008 (2008) (with Thomas H. Cook and Otto Penzler)
With Strings Attached: The Art and Beauty of Vintage Guitars (2008)

References

External links
 Jonathan Kellerman's website

1949 births
Living people
American mystery writers
American Orthodox Jews
21st-century American psychologists
Anthony Award winners
Edgar Award winners
Jewish American novelists
University of California, Los Angeles alumni
University of Southern California alumni
University of Southern California faculty
Writers from Los Angeles
Writers from New York City
Jewish American social scientists
American male novelists
Novelists from New York (state)
21st-century American Jews
20th-century American psychologists